Krzysztof Zwoliński (born 2 January 1959 in Krapkowice) was a Polish athlete who competed mainly in the 100 metres. He was a Polish 60 metre indoor champion in 1986.

He competed for Poland at the 1980 Summer Olympics held in Moscow, Soviet Union where he won the silver medal in the men's 4 x 100 metre relay event with his team mates Zenon Licznerski, Leszek Dunecki and Marian Woronin.

He also competed in the 100 metres but did not qualify through the quarter finals.

See also
Polish records in athletics

References

Sports Reference

1959 births
Living people
Polish male sprinters
Olympic silver medalists for Poland
Athletes (track and field) at the 1980 Summer Olympics
Olympic athletes of Poland
People from Krapkowice
Sportspeople from Opole Voivodeship
Medalists at the 1980 Summer Olympics
Olympic silver medalists in athletics (track and field)
Friendship Games medalists in athletics
20th-century Polish people